Ringwoodite is a high-pressure phase of Mg2SiO4 (magnesium silicate) formed at high temperatures and pressures of the Earth's mantle between  depth. It may also contain iron and hydrogen. It is polymorphous with the olivine phase forsterite (a magnesium iron silicate).

Ringwoodite is notable for being able to contain hydroxide ions (oxygen and hydrogen atoms bound together) within its structure. In this case two hydroxide ions usually take the place of a magnesium ion and two oxide ions.

Combined with evidence of its occurrence deep in the Earth's mantle, this suggests that there is from one to three times the world ocean's equivalent of water in the mantle transition zone from 410 to 660 km deep.

This mineral was first identified in the Tenham meteorite in 1969, and is inferred to be present in large quantities in the Earth's mantle.

Ringwoodite was named after the Australian earth scientist Ted Ringwood (1930–1993), who studied polymorphic phase transitions in the common mantle minerals olivine and pyroxene at pressures equivalent to depths as great as about 600 km.

Olivine, wadsleyite, and ringwoodite are polymorphs found in the upper mantle of the earth. The properties of these minerals determine many of the properties of the mantle.

Characteristics
Ringwoodite is polymorphous with forsterite, Mg2SiO4, and has a spinel structure. Spinel group minerals crystallize in the isometric system with an octahedral habit.

Ringwoodite is thought to be the most abundant mineral phase in the lower part of Earth's transition zone. The physical and chemical property of this mineral partly determine properties of the mantle at those depths.  The pressure range for stability of ringwoodite lies in the approximate range from 18 to 23 GPa.

Natural ringwoodite has been found in many shocked chondritic meteorites, in which the ringwoodite occurs as fine-grained polycrystalline aggregates.

Natural ringwoodite generally contains much more Mg than Fe but can form a gapless solid solution series from the pure Mg endmember to the pure Fe endmember. The latter has been discovered in a natural sample only recently and was named ahrensite, in honor of US mineral physicist Thomas J. Ahrens (1936–2010).

Geological occurrences
In meteorites, ringwoodite occurs in the veinlets of quenched shock-melt cutting the matrix and replacing olivine probably produced during shock metamorphism.

In Earth's interior, olivine occurs in the upper mantle at depths less than about 410 km, and ringwoodite is inferred to be present within the transition zone from about 520 to 660 km depth. Seismic activity discontinuities at about 410 km, 520 km, and at 660 km depth have been attributed to phase changes involving olivine and its polymorphs.

The 520-km depth discontinuity is generally believed to be caused by the transition of the olivine polymorph wadsleyite (beta-phase) to ringwoodite (gamma-phase), while the 660-km depth discontinuity by the phase transformation of ringwoodite (gamma-phase) to a silicate perovskite plus magnesiowüstite.

Ringwoodite in the lower half of the transition zone is inferred to play a pivotal role in mantle dynamics, and the plastic properties of ringwoodite are thought to be critical in determining flow of material in this part of the mantle. The ability of ringwoodite to incorporate hydroxide is important because of its effect on rheology.

Ringwoodite has been synthesized at conditions appropriate to the transition zone, containing up to 2.6 weight percent water.

Because the transition zone between the Earth's upper and lower mantle helps govern the scale of mass and heat transport throughout the Earth, the presence of water within this region, whether global or localized, may have a significant effect on mantle rheology and therefore mantle circulation.  In subduction zones, the ringwoodite stability field hosts high levels of seismicity.

An "ultradeep" diamond (one that has risen from a great depth) found in Juína in western Brazil contained an inclusion of ringwoodite — at the time the only known sample of natural terrestrial origin — thus providing evidence of significant amounts of water as hydroxide in the Earth's mantle. The gemstone, about 5mm long, was brought up by a diatreme eruption. The ringwoodite inclusion is too small to see with the naked eye. A second such diamond was later found.

The mantle reservoir is found to contain about three times more water, in the form of hydroxide contained within the wadsleyite and ringwoodite crystal structure, than the Earth's oceans combined.

Synthetic
For experiments, hydrous ringwoodite has been synthesized by mixing powders of forsterite, brucite, and silica so as to give the desired final elemental composition.

Crystal structure 
Ringwoodite has the spinel structure, in the isometric crystal system with space group Fdm (or F3m). On an atomic scale, magnesium and silicon are in octahedral and tetrahedral coordination with oxygen, respectively. The Si-O and Mg-O bonds have mixed ionic and covalent character. The cubic unit cell parameter is 8.063 Å for pure Mg2SiO4 and 8.234 Å for pure Fe2SiO4.

Chemical composition 
Ringwoodite compositions range from pure Mg2SiO4 to Fe2SiO4 in synthesis experiments. Ringwoodite can incorporate up to 2.6 percent by weight H2O.

Physical properties

The physical properties of ringwoodite are affected by pressure and temperature. At the pressure and temperature condition of the Mantle Transition Zone, the calculated density value of ringwoodite is 3.90 g/cm3 for pure Mg2SiO4; 4.13 g/cm3 for (Mg0.91,Fe0.09)2SiO4 of pyrolitic mantle; and 4.85 g/cm3 for Fe2SiO4. It is an isotropic mineral with an index of refraction n = 1.768.

The colour of ringwoodite varies between the meteorites, between different ringwoodite bearing aggregates, and even in one single aggregate. The ringwoodite aggregates can show every shade of blue, purple, grey and green, or have no colour at all.

A closer look at coloured aggregates shows that the colour is not homogeneous, but seems to originate from something with a size similar to the ringwoodite crystallites.  In synthetic samples, pure Mg ringwoodite is colourless, whereas samples containing more than one mole percent Fe2SiO4 are deep blue in colour. The colour is thought to be due to Fe2+–Fe3+ charge transfer.

References

Magnesium minerals
Iron minerals
Nesosilicates
Polymorphism (materials science)
Spinel group
Cubic minerals
Minerals in space group 227
High pressure science